Musa arunachalensis is a species in the genus Musa. It was first described in 2013 by botanists from the University of Calicut in Kerala.

References

arunachalensis
Flora of Arunachal Pradesh
Plants described in 2013